Holly High School (HHS) is a public high school for grades 9–12 located in Holly, Michigan. It provides secondary education for students living in Holly, Davisburg, Springfield Township, Rose Township, and White Lake Township. Its official mascot is the Broncho and its colors are red, white, and grey. In 1952, Holly High School opted to change the spelling of its mascot from Bronco to Broncho since the spelling was commonly used. Holly High School is the only high school in the Holly Area School District. The current high school, built in 1999 in Holly Township, Michigan, replaced a high school building that had been built down the street in 1958. The 1958 building, which has for its official address 920 East Baird Street, became a middle school but today is home to Karl Richter Community Center and Holly Area Schools' administrative offices and had, in return, replaced a 1910s school building on College Street, today the site of a church.

In recent years, Holly High School has taken advantage of school closures to invite displaced students of closed schools to attend HHS in order for their families to relocate to the Holly area.  Because of this HHS has welcomed former students of Flint Central, Pontiac Central and, most recently, Flint Northern High School.

Performing arts

The Holly High School band program consists of marching band and color guard during the fall season and concert/symphony band during the winter and spring seasons.
The Holly High School Main Street Show Choir is also active and performs year-round, as does the Holly High School Concert Choir.

Notable alumni
 Jim Ray, former Major League Baseball pitcher for Houston Astros and Detroit Tigers.
 First Lt. Karl W. Richter, U.S. Air Force, "At the age of 23, on Sept. 21, 1966, Richter became the youngest American pilot in Southeast Asia to shoot down a Communist Mig 17."

References

External links
Holly High School Website

Educational institutions established in 1867
Public high schools in Michigan
High schools in Oakland County, Michigan
1867 establishments in Michigan